Matteo Bono (born 11 November 1983) is an Italian former road bicycle racer, who competed professionally for the  through various team iterations between 2006 and 2018.

Career
Born in Iseo, Bono turned professional in 2006 and he took his first professional wins in 2007, winning stage six at Tirreno–Adriatico and stage three of the Tour de Romandie; he won the latter after being in a breakaway with Fumiyuki Beppu and Marco Pinotti and outsprinted Beppu on the line.

Career achievements

Major results

2007
 1st Stage 6 Tirreno–Adriatico
 1st Stage 3 Tour de Romandie
 1st Stage 1 Tour de Pologne
2011
 1st Stage 5 Eneco Tour

Grand Tour general classification results timeline

References

External links

1983 births
Living people
People from Iseo, Lombardy
Italian male cyclists
Cyclists from the Province of Brescia